Woodville Township is one of the twelve townships of Sandusky County, Ohio, United States.  As of the 2000 census, 3,304 people lived in the township, 1,327 of whom lived in the unincorporated portions of the township.

Geography
Located in the northwestern corner of the county, it borders the following townships:
Clay Township, Ottawa County - north
Harris Township, Ottawa County - northeast
Washington Township - east
Madison Township - south
Freedom Township, Wood County - southwest
Troy Township, Wood County - west

The village of Woodville is located in central Woodville Township.

Name and history
Woodville Township was organized in 1840. It was named for Amos E. Wood, a member of Congress.

It is the only Woodville Township statewide.

Government
The township is governed by a three-member board of trustees, who are elected in November of odd-numbered years to a four-year term beginning on the following January 1. Two are elected in the year after the presidential election and one is elected in the year before it. There is also an elected township fiscal officer, who serves a four-year term beginning on April 1 of the year after the election, which is held in November of the year before the presidential election. Vacancies in the fiscal officership or on the board of trustees are filled by the remaining trustees.

References

External links
County website

Townships in Sandusky County, Ohio
Townships in Ohio